Kutlinka (Qotlo) is a rural locality (a village) in Kariyevsky Selsoviet, Krasnokamsky District, Bashkortostan, Russia. The population was 233 as of 2010. There are 11 streets.

Geography 
Kutlinka is located 15 km southeast of Nikolo-Beryozovka (the district's administrative centre) by road. Neftekamsk is the nearest rural locality.

References 

Rural localities in Krasnokamsky District
Ufa Governorate